Podonominae is a subfamily of midges in the non-biting midge family (Chironomidae).

Tribes & genera
Tribe Boreochlini Saether, 1981
Genus Boreochlus  Edwards, 1938
Genus Lasiodiamesa  Kieffer, 1924
Genus Paraboreochlus  Thienemann, 1939
Genus Trichotanypus  Kieffer, 1906
Tribe Podonomini Kieffer, 1922
Genus Parochlus  Enderlein, 1912

References

Chironomidae
Nematocera subfamilies